Brailyn Márquez (born January 30, 1999) is a Dominican professional baseball pitcher in the Chicago Cubs organization.

Professional career
Márquez signed with the Chicago Cubs as an international free agent, in August 2015. He made his professional debut in 2016 with the Dominican Summer League Cubs, going 4–2 with a 1.48 earned run average (ERA) over 12 starts. Márquez played 2017 with the Arizona League Cubs, pitching to a 2–1 record and a 5.52 ERA over 11 games (nine starts), and 2018 with the Eugene Emeralds and South Bend Cubs, compiling a 1–4 record with a 3.13 ERA over 12 starts.

Márquez started 2019 with South Bend before being promoted to the Myrtle Beach Pelicans. Over 22 starts between the two teams, he pitched to a 9–5 record with a 3.13 ERA, striking out 128 over  innings.

Márquez was selected to the 40-man and active rosters by the Cubs on September 27, 2020. He made his MLB debut that night against the Chicago White Sox, pitching  of an inning of relief.

In 2021, Márquez suffered a delayed spring training, a COVID-19 infection, as well as a left shoulder strain, all culminating in a lost season of development for him.

On November 18, 2022, Márquez was non tendered and became a free agent. On December 5, Márquez re-signed with the Cubs on a minor league contract.

References

External links

1999 births
Living people
Major League Baseball players from the Dominican Republic
Major League Baseball pitchers
Chicago Cubs players
Dominican Summer League Cubs players
Arizona League Cubs players
Eugene Emeralds players
South Bend Cubs players
Myrtle Beach Pelicans players